The 1931–32 Rugby Football League season was the 37th season of rugby league football in northern England.

Season summary

St. Helens won their first championship when they defeated Huddersfield 9-5 in the play-off final.

Huddersfield had finished the regular season as league leaders.

The Challenge Cup Winners were Leeds who beat Swinton 11-8 in the final.

St. Helens won the Lancashire League, and Hunslet won the Yorkshire League. Salford beat Swinton 10–8 to win the Lancashire County Cup, and Huddersfield beat Hunslet 4–2 to win the Yorkshire County Cup.

Championship

Championship play-off

Challenge Cup

Leeds beat Swinton 11-8 in the Challenge Cup Final played at Central Park, Wigan on Saturday 9 April 1932 before a crowd of 29,000.

This was Leeds’ third Cup Final win in as many Cup Final appearances.

Sources
 1931-32 Rugby Football League season at wigan.rlfans.com
 The Challenge Cup at The Rugby Football League website

References

1931 in English rugby league
1932 in English rugby league
Northern Rugby Football League seasons